Deris Ariel Umanzor Guevara (born 7 January 1980) is a retired Salvadoran professional footballer.

Club career
Deris Umanzor began his career in the youth system of Municipal Limeño and eventually moved up to the first team in 1998.

After six seasons with Municipal Limeño, Umanzor moved to top Salvadoran side Águila in 2005. Umanzor has been one of the top left backs in the Salvadoran Primera División.

On 8 April 2010, he was acquired by MLS club Chicago Fire.

Umanzor and Chicago Fire mutually agreed to terminate his contract on 9 February 2011, making him a free agent.

In May 2011 it was announced he would return to Águila after the 2011 CONCACAF Gold Cup.

Umanzor finished his career with the second most games in the primera division with 622 games, 429 games and 20 goals with Aguila, and 193 games and 26 goals with Municipal Limeño 

After being released By Aguila at the end 2017, In January 2018, Deris Umanzor announced his retirement from football.

International career
Umanzor made his debut for El Salvador in an October 2000 FIFA World Cup qualification match against Saint Vincent and the Grenadines and has, as of February 2012, earned a total of 44 caps, scoring 2 goals.

He has represented his country in 9 FIFA World Cup qualification matches and played at the 2001, 2005 and 2011 UNCAF Nations Cups as well as at the 2002 and 2009 CONCACAF Gold Cups and was a non-playing squad member at the 2011 CONCACAF Gold Cup.

International goals

References

External links
 
 

1980 births
Living people
People from La Unión Department
Association football defenders
Salvadoran footballers
El Salvador international footballers
2001 UNCAF Nations Cup players
2002 CONCACAF Gold Cup players
2005 UNCAF Nations Cup players
2009 UNCAF Nations Cup players
2009 CONCACAF Gold Cup players
2011 Copa Centroamericana players
2011 CONCACAF Gold Cup players
C.D. Águila footballers
Chicago Fire FC players
Salvadoran expatriate footballers
Expatriate soccer players in the United States
Major League Soccer players
Salvadoran expatriate sportspeople in the United States